John Jenkins (20 February 1936 – 1 June 1980) was  a former Australian rules footballer who played with Richmond and North Melbourne in the Victorian Football League (VFL).

Notes

External links 
		
		
		
		
		

1936 births
1980 deaths
Australian rules footballers from Victoria (Australia)
Richmond Football Club players
North Melbourne Football Club players